Tasaral Island (Tasaral) is an island in Lake Balkhash. It is located in the western part of the lake.

Geography
The shore of the island is rocky —'Tas' meaning "rock" and 'Aral' meaning "island"— with cliffs rising above the lake. Named after the island, the small town of Tasaral, founded in 1928 and dedicated mainly to fisheries, is located on the shore opposite the NW point of Tasaral Island. 

Administratively Tasaral Island belongs to the Aktogay District of the Karaganda Region of Kazakhstan.

Fauna
The Central Asiatic frog (Rana asiatica) is one of the amphibians found on the island.

See also
List of islands of Kazakhstan

References

Lake Balkhash
Lake islands of Kazakhstan